Gopal Pacherwal (born 3 January 1985) is an Indian politician and a member of the 9th Lok Sabha. He was elected to the Lok Sabha, lower house of the Parliament of India from Tonk in Rajasthan in the 1989 Indian general election as a member of the Janata Dal, defeating senior Indian National Congress leader Banwari Lal Bairwa. He was elected to the Rajasthan Legislative Assembly from Patan constituency in Rajasthan in the 1977 and 1980 Rajasthan Legislative Assembly election as a member of the Rashtriya Janata Dal.

References

External links
 Official biographical sketch in Parliament of India website

1948 births
Living people
India MPs 1989–1991
Lok Sabha members from Rajasthan
Janata Dal politicians
People from Bundi district
Samata Party politicians
Janata Dal (United) politicians
Janata Party politicians
Bharatiya Janata Party politicians from Rajasthan